This is a list of schools in the Vale of Glamorgan in Wales.

Nursery schools
 Cadoxton Nursery School
 Cogan Nursery School
 Bute Cottage Nursery School
 Little Westbourne Nursery School

Primary schools

Albert Primary School
All Saints CW Primary School
Barry Island Primary School
Cadoxton Primary School
Cogan Primary School
Colcot Primary School
Dinas Powys Primary School
Evenlode Primary School
Fairfield Primary School
Gladstone Primary School
Gwenfo CW Primary School
High Street Primary School
Holton Primary School
Jenner Park Primary School
Llancarfan Primary School
Llandough Primary School
Llanfair Primary School
Llangan Primary School
Llansannor CW Primary School
Oakfield Primary School
Palmerston Primary School
Pendoylan CW Primary School
Peterston-Super-Ely CW Primary School
Rhws Primary School
Romilly Primary School
St. Andrew's Major CW Primary School
St. Athan Primary School
St Bride's Major CW Primary School
St David's CW Primary School
St Illtyd Primary School
St Helen's RC Infant School
St Helen's RC Junior School
St Joseph's RC Primary School
St Nicholas CW Primary School
Sully Primary School
Victoria Primary School
Wick & Marcross CW Primary School
Y Bont Faen Primary School
Ysgol Y Ddraig

Welsh medium primary schools 
Ysgol Nant Talwg
Ysgol Dewi Sant 
Ysgol Gwaun y Nant
Ysgol Gymraeg Pen-y-Garth
Ysgol Iolo Morganwg
Ysgol Sant Baruc 
Ysgol Sant Curig

Secondary schools
Barry Comprehensive School 
Bryn Hafren Comprehensive School 
Cowbridge Comprehensive School 
Llantwit Major School 
Mary Immaculate High School (administered as part of the Cardiff local education authority)
St Cyres School 
St Richard Gwyn RC High School 
Stanwell School

Welsh medium secondary schools 
Ysgol Gyfun Bro Morgannwg

Pupil referral units
 Y Daith

Special schools
Ysgol Y Deri

Independent special schools 
Headlands School
Beechwood College (A further education college aged 16–25 for Aspergers and Autism.)

Independent schools
Atlantic College
Westbourne Prep School Penarth|Westbourne Senior School and Sixth Form]]

Further education colleges
Cardiff and Vale College

 
Vale of Glamorgan